is a Japanese manga artist.

He created Togari and authored the prestige format Batman manga mini-series Batman: Death Mask in April 2008. In 2013, he published his series White Tiger in Grand Jump.

Works
A list of completed or working on projects:
 Togari
 Kurozakuro
 Batman: Death Mask
 Togari Shiro
 White Tiger

See also
 Batman: Child of Dreams, the previous manga outing for Batman from Kia Asamiya.
 Batman: Black and White, an anthology of Batman stories, including a manga take from Katsuhiro Otomo.
Yoshinori Natume has written 32 different graphic novels.

Notes

References

 Yoshinori Natsume at Lambiek

External links
 Batman: Death Mask #1 Review, Comics Bulletin, April 11, 2008

1975 births
Living people
Manga artists